Reyhan may refer to:

Places
  Al Rihan, a small village in Lebanon, also called Rihan, on a mountain called Al Rehan
 Um ar-Rehan, a Palestinian village
 Reihan, an Israeli settlement
 Reyhan-e Olya, a village in Khomeyn County, Markazi Province, Iran
 Reyhan-e Sofla, a village in Khomeyn County, Markazi Province, Iran
 Reyhan, East Azerbaijan, a village in East Azerbaijan Province, Iran
 Reyhan, Fars, a village in Fars Province, Iran
 Reyhan, Kerman, a village in Kerman Province, Iran
 Reyhan, Khuzestan, a village in Khuzestan Province, Iran
 Reyhan, Markazi, a village in Delijan County, Markazi Province, Iran
 Reyhan, Razavi Khorasan, a village in Razavi Khorasan Province, Iran
 Reyhan, Zanjan, a village in Zanjan Province, Iran

Other
 Reyhan (name), list of people with the name
 Reyhan (script), one of the six canonical scripts of Perso-Arabic calligraphy
 Daughter of the mountains – Reyhan (song), Azerbaijani folk song